Irwins Crossroads is an unincorporated community in Washington County, in the U.S. state of Georgia.

History
The community was named after the local Irwin family of pioneer citizens. Variant names were "Irwin Crossroads" and "Irwins". A post office called Irwin's Cross Roads was established in 1842, and remained in operation until 1873.

References

Unincorporated communities in Washington County, Georgia
Unincorporated communities in Georgia (U.S. state)